The freshman's dream is a name sometimes given to the erroneous equation , where  is a real number (usually a positive integer greater than 1) and  are nonzero real numbers. Beginning students commonly make this error in computing the power of a sum of real numbers, falsely assuming powers distribute over sums. When n = 2, it is easy to see why this is incorrect: (x + y)2 can be correctly computed  as x2 + 2xy + y2 using distributivity (commonly known by students as the FOIL method). For larger positive integer values of n, the correct result is given by the binomial theorem.

The name "freshman's dream" also sometimes refers to the theorem that says that for a prime number p, if x and y are members of a commutative ring of characteristic p, then 
(x + y)p = xp + yp. In this more exotic type of arithmetic, the "mistake" actually gives the correct result, since p divides all the binomial coefficients apart from the first and the last, making all intermediate terms equal to zero.

The identity is also actually true in the context of tropical geometry, where multiplication is replaced with addition, and addition is replaced with minimum.

Examples
, but . 
 does not generally equal . For example, which does not equal . In this example, the error is being committed with the exponent .

Prime characteristic

This can be seen by examining the prime factors of the binomial coefficients: the nth binomial coefficient is

The numerator is p factorial, which is divisible by p. Since a binomial coefficient is always an integer, the nth binomial coefficient is divisible by p and hence equal to 0 in the ring. We are left with the zeroth and pth coefficients, which both equal 1, yielding the desired equation.

Thus in characteristic p the freshman's dream is a valid identity. This result demonstrates that exponentiation by p produces an endomorphism, known as the Frobenius endomorphism of the ring.

The demand that the characteristic p be a prime number is central to the truth of the freshman's dream. A related theorem states that if p is prime then  in the polynomial ring . This theorem is a key fact in modern primality testing.

History and alternate names
The history of the term "freshman's dream" is somewhat unclear. This may be the first connection between "freshman" and binomial expansion in fields of positive characteristic. Since then, authors of undergraduate algebra texts took note of the common error. The first actual attestation of the phrase "freshman's dream" seems to be in Hungerford's graduate algebra textbook (1974), where he quotes McBrien. Alternative terms include "freshman exponentiation", used in Fraleigh (1998). The term "freshman's dream" itself, in non-mathematical contexts, is recorded since the 19th century.

See also
Pons asinorum
Primality test
Sophomore's dream
Frobenius endomorphism

References

Algebra education
Mathematical fallacies
Theorems in ring theory
Prime numbers